Mongpan (also spelt Möngpan), also known as Maingpan was a Shan state in what is today Burma. It belonged to the Eastern Division of the Southern Shan States. 

The town of Mong Pan was formerly the residence of the Sawbwa of Mongpan State. The capital is in the middle of a fertile plain. Most of the other areas of the state are mountainous, rich in teak forests. Loi Hkilek, a 2,133 high mountain is located in Mongkyawt District.

History
According to legend there had been a predecessor state. Mongpan state was founded in 1637, but little is known of the history of the state before the times of British Burma.

The four districts of Mongtang, Monghang, Mongkyawt and Monghta, located east of the Salween were historically claimed by Siam, but the British upheld the view that they belonged to the Cis-Salween Sawbwa of Mongpan. 
In 1888 Siamese troops were posted in the four trans-Salween districts; Siam also claimed a further district, Monghsat, but posted no troops there.  

In 1889 the British formed the 1889-90 Anglo-Siamese Boundary Commission, in order to solve the difficulties with Siam concerning the trans-Salween dependencies of Mawkmai, Mongpan, and Karenni. This commission however, would not be successful for Siam declined to join it at the last moment. Nevertheless, the commission went ahead despite the lack of agreement from the Siamese government and brought about the partition of these tracts and their incorporation into British Burma. British troops forced the Siamese garrisons to withdraw from the territories of the trans-Salween that were deemed not to belong to Siam. Finally the demarcation of the new frontier was carried out by the joint 1892-3 Anglo-Siamese Boundary Commission.

Between December 1943 and 1945 the occupying Japanese allowed the government of Siam to annex all four districts of Mongpan State east of the Salween as part of the Saharat Thai Doem territory —together with Kengtung State.

Rulers
The rulers of Mongpan bore the title of Saopha after 1867; their ritual style was Kambawsa Mahawuntha Thirdamaraza.

Myozas
1637 - ....                Tawk La 
.... - ....                Twak Hkam 
.... - ....                Twak Twe     
.... - ....                Op La     
.... - ....                Hkun Som  
.... - ....                Shwe Tong  
.... - ....                Sai U 
.... - ....                Sai Nyo
.... - 1809                Naw Hkam                           (d. 1809)
1809 - 1823                Mana Ne Myo                        (d. 1823)
1823 - 1858                Maung Shwe Hkam                    (d. 1858) 
1858 - 1867                Hkun Tun U                         (d. 1886)

Saophas 
1867 - 1886                Hkun Tun U                         (s.a.) 
1886 - 1918                Hkun Num Leng                      (b. 1869 - d. 1918)
1918 - 1952                Hkun On

See also
Anglo-Siamese Treaty of 1909

References

External links
"Gazetteer of Upper Burma and the Shan states"
The Imperial Gazetteer of India

Shan States

ca:Mongpan